"Questions" is a song by Canadian R&B recording artist Tamia. It was written and produced by singer R. Kelly for her third studio album More (2004). Released as the album's second single in the United States, it reached number 40 on the US Billboard Hot R&B/Hip-Hop Songs chart.

Music video
A music video for "Questions" was directed by Darren Grant.

Credits and personnel
Credits adapted from the liner notes of More.

Steve Bearsley – recording
Andy Gallas – recording
R. Kelly – production, writer
Donnie Lyle – guitar
Ian Mereness – mixing, recording
Jason Mlodzinski – mixing assistance
Herb Powers – mastering
Nathan Wheeler – engineering assistance

Charts

References

External links
 TamiaWorld.com — official site

2004 singles
2004 songs
Tamia songs
Elektra Records singles
Songs written by R. Kelly